Banca Cassa di Risparmio di Savigliano S.p.A. is an Italian saving bank. The bank was based in Savigliano, in the Province of Cuneo, Piedmont.

Since the bank reforms in 1991, the bank was split into a società per azioni and a non-profit banking foundation. Cassa di Risparmio di Torino (Banca CRT) once became a minority shareholders of the bank. However, its successor, UniCredit sold their possession on Savigliano (31.006%), Bra (31.021%), Fossano (23.077%) and Saluzzo (31.019%) to Banca Popolare dell'Emilia Romagna for about €149 million. (which BPER paid €33.409 million for CR Savigliano's shares)

External links
 Official Website

See also

 Cassa di Risparmio di Cuneo

References

Banks established in 1858
1858 establishments in the Kingdom of Sardinia
Banks of Italy
Companies based in Piedmont
Province of Cuneo